"I Wanna B with U" is a song by German Eurodance band Fun Factory, released on 18 April 1995, as the first single from their second album, Fun-Tastic (1995). It was a top 10 hit in Canada, while in Europe, the song peaked at number 11 in Germany, number 12 in Finland and number 18 in Austria. Additionally, it was a top 30 hit in Iceland and reached number 59 on the Eurochart Hot 100 in July 1995. In the US, the song peaked at number 45 on the Billboard Hot 100 and number 10 on the Billboard Hot Dance Club Play chart. It remains one of their most successful songs and is also their biggest hit in the US. The track was released with remixes by Mousse T, Sequential One and Simon Harris.

Critical reception
Larry Flick from Billboard felt that songs like "I Wanna B with U" "are dance music in its purest and celebratory form." A reviewer from Music Week gave it four out of five, writing, "A reggae-flavoured, summery song with the oft-repeated title line providing a great hook. Certain to make radio playlists, with big sales to follow." James Hamilton from the RM Dance Update described it as a "plaintive girl chanted and gruff chaps rapped Euro reggae lurcher".

Music video
The accompanying music video for "I Wanna B with U" was directed by Frank Paul Husmann-Labusga. It features the band performing the song at a garden party. The video was later published on Fun Factory's official YouTube channel in August 2015, and had generated more than 6 million views as of January 2023.

Track listing

 7" single, Germany
"I Wanna B with U" (On The Air Rap) – 3:33
"I Wanna B with U" (On The Air Vocal) – 3:33

 12", Germany
"I Wanna B with U" (B On The Floor Extended) – 4:40
"I Wanna B with U" (B In The Groove) – 3:33
"I Wanna B with U" (Sequential One Remix) – 5:38
"I Wanna B with U" (Mousse T's Old School) – 4:16

 CD single, US
"I Wanna B with U" – 3:32
"We Are the World" – 4:08

 CD maxi, Germany
"I Wanna B with U" (B On The Air Vocal) – 3:33
"I Wanna B with U" (B On The Air Rap) – 3:33
"I Wanna B with U" (B On The Floor Extended) – 4:40
"I Wanna B with U" (Mousse T's Old School) – 4:16
"Fun Factory's Kick" (Maxi Edit) – 4:40

 CD maxi (Remixes), Europe
"I Wanna B with U" (Homegirls International Remix) – 5:38
"I Wanna B with U" (Mousse T's House Dub Edit) – 3:30
"I Wanna B with U" (Sequential One Remix) – 5:38
"I Wanna B with U" (Simon Harris' Jamaican Stylee) – 5:05

Charts

Weekly charts

Year-end charts

References

1995 singles
1995 songs
English-language German songs
Fun Factory (band) songs
Music videos directed by Frank Paul Husmann
Songs written by Toni Cottura